Gārgya (feminine Gārgī, "descendant of Garga") may refer to:
 Author of some of the sukthas of Atharva Veda, son of Garga and father of Kalayavana
 King of Gandharvas
 Author of the Samaveda-Padapatha

See also 
 Garga (disambiguation)